Goyang Zaicro FC was a South Korean professional football team based in Goyang. The club competed in the K League Challenge between 2013 and 2016. They played their home games at Goyang Stadium.

The club traces its origins to Immanuel FC, a Christian football club founded in 1983. The team previously played in Iksan and Gimpo before moving to Ansan.

History
Immanuel FC, the predecessor of Goyang Zaicro FC, was founded in 1983. In 1985, Immanuel FC and Hallelujah FC decided to join together to create a unified Christian football club. As a result, Immanuel FC became Hallelujah's reserve team. After the 1985 season, Hallelujah FC left the professional ranks in order to concentrate their financial efforts on missionary work.

The two clubs separated after one year. Immanuel FC participated in many tournaments as an amateur football club. They even competed with Hallelujah FC in 1991.

In 1992, Immanuel FC suffered from a lack of funds. Therefore, E-Land took over the team and renamed it E-Land Puma FC. From 1992 to 1998, they won the three championships in some tournaments.

At the start of 1998, the Asian economic crisis affected the club's parent group E-Land, necessitating the release of the club, which became amateur again as Immanuel FC. The club brought in some footballers for Hallelujah FC and changed their name to Hallelujah FC. in 1999. This Hallelujah FC founded in 1999 is the official starting point of Goyang Hi FC history by K League. In 2003 the team moved to Iksan and joined the Korea National League, finishing a creditable third after the First Stage, but were prevented from competing in the Second Stage after protests by radical Won Buddhists led to the club being barred from playing in Iksan. The club moved to Gimpo, where they enjoyed their most successful season in the National League in 2006, completing the Second Stage at the summit of the league, before being defeated in the Championship Play-off. The club moved again, this time to Ansan, in 2007, enjoying another successful campaign in 2008, a season which saw them reach the final of the National League Championship, where they were defeated on penalties, before evolving into Ansan 'H' FC for the 2012 National League season. In September 2012, it was confirmed that the team would be moving to Goyang City for the 2013 season, and will change its name to Goyang Hi FC.

On 18 January 2016, the club name officially changed to Goyang Zaicro FC for the 2016 season due to sponsorship reasons. The club was disbanded after the 2016 season.

Club Naming History 
Predecessor
1983–1984: Immanuel FC
1985: Hallelujah FC (reserve team)
1986–1992: Immanuel FC
1992–1998: E-Land Puma FC
1998: Immanuel FC

Refounded
1999–2002: Hallelujah FC
2003: Iksan Hallelujah FC
2004–2006: Gimpo Hallelujah FC
2007–2011: Ansan Hallelujah FC
2012: Ansan H FC
2013–2015: Goyang Hi FC
2016: Goyang Zaicro FC

Managers

Honours

Domestic competitions

League
 National League
Runners-up (1): 2006

Cups
 National Football Championship
Winners (1): 2006
 Runners-up (1): 2002

Worldwide competitions
 Queen's Cup
Winners (1): 2009

Statistics

See also
 Hallelujah FC
 E-Land Puma FC

References

External links

 
Sport in Gyeonggi Province
Korea National League clubs
K League 2 clubs
Association football clubs established in 1999
Association football clubs disestablished in 2016
1999 establishments in South Korea
2016 disestablishments in South Korea